Young Men and Fire is a 1992 non-fiction book written by Norman Maclean. It is an account of Norman Maclean's research of the Mann Gulch fire of 1949 and the 13 men who died there. The fire occurred in Mann Gulch in the Gates of the Mountains Wilderness on August 5. The book won the National Book Critics Circle Award (1992).

Synopsis

Norman Maclean and Laird Robinson, in an attempt to forensically analyze the Mann Gulch Fire, brought together multiple sources, including the official report of the United States Forest Service of the fire, the testimony of the three men who fought the fire and lived, and the research and report of Robert Jansson and Harry T. Gisborne (who would suffer a fatal heart attack at Mann Gulch two months later trying to get to the bottom of the tragedy). On the day of the fire, Jansson was ranger on duty of the Helena National Forest's Canyon Ferry District, the area that included Mann Gulch. Maclean and Robinson also took Walter Rumsey and Robert Sallee, the only two living survivors of the fire team (as survivor Wag Dodge died in 1955), back to the scene of the fire in 1978, hoping that walking the ground again would help solve some of the missing pieces. Additionally, Maclean and Robinson would use the modern Fire Lab and their mathematical analysis (advances in fire methodology not available in 1949), to search for answers to the fire.

With all of these pieces, several trips to Mann Gulch, and ideas bantered back and forth between each other, Bud Moore, Ed Heilman, Rich Rothermel, Frank Albini, and other members of the U.S. Forest Service forest fire investigators, Maclean and Robinson came to new conclusions on the fire's events: that the wind went in the opposite direction than was originally thought possible, and once the fire got started, it created its own unique weather system (which few thought possible before this research). 

It was always assumed that the wind was traveling south, or upstream, on the Missouri River at that time of day. Instead, they proved that the wind was traveling north, or downriver, and that the top of the ridge (which juts out as the river bends sharply to the northwest and separates Mann Gulch and Meriwether Canyon) split this downriver wind in two. These two separate smaller winds then re-converged (on the other side of the ridge) in the heart of the gulch (at right angles). This convergence combined with massive heat, produced by the fire and the hot August afternoon.

Additionally, the vegetation pattern played a part in how the fire developed and took the lives of the men. The south side of the gulch was of the mountains, with taller forested trees, but the north side of the gulch was of the plains, with smaller trees and dense grasses. This combination of contrasting vegetation, heat, air currents, and right-angle winds, would cause the fire to change direction instantly, trapping and killing most of the fire fighters in its path.

Related
Norman Maclean's son, John Norman Maclean, wrote the 1999 book Fire on the Mountain that told a very similar story about the South Canyon Fire on Storm King Mountain on July 6, 1994 in Colorado, which took the lives of 14 firefighters.

References
 Maclean, Norman, (1993). - Young Men and Fire. - Chicago, Illinois: University of Chicago Press. -

External links
 Young Men and Fire - University of Chicago Press
Excerpt: p.70-75 ~ from Young Men and Fire - University of Chicago Press
Wright, Chris (2018-11-20). "The Real Toll of the West’s Battle with Fire". Gear Patrol. Retrieved 2022-05-11.

1992 non-fiction books
American non-fiction books
National Book Critics Circle Award-winning works
University of Chicago Press books
History books about the United States
Books about Montana